The Narayan Pakuria Murail railway station in the Indian state of West Bengal, serves Murail, India in Purba Medinipur district. It is on the Howrah–Kharagpur line.

History
It is a small railway station between Howrah and Kharagpur. Local EMU trains stop here. The Howrah–Kharagpur line was opened in 1900. The Howrah–Panskura stretch has three lines.
The Howrah–Kharagpur line was electrified in 1967–69.

References

External links
Trains at Narayan Pakuria Murail

Railway stations in Purba Medinipur district
Kolkata Suburban Railway stations